The City of Dubbo was a local government area in the Orana region of New South Wales, Australia.  The former area is located adjacent to the Mitchell, Newell, and the Golden highways, the Main Western railway line, and the Macquarie River.

Following an independent review, on 12 May 2016 the Minister for Local Government announced the dissolution of the Dubbo City Council and the Wellington Council, together with the establishment of the Western Plains Regional Council with immediate effect.

The last mayor of the City of Dubbo was Clr. Mathew Dickerson, an independent politician.

The last deputy mayor of the City of Dubbo was Clr. Ben Shields, an unaligned politician. Clr. Ben Shields was elected in 1st position at the 2012 and 2008 Dubbo City Council elections.

The largest population centre in the former area is the regional city of Dubbo. The local government area also included the villages of Eumungerie, Mogriguy, Brocklehurst, Wongarbon, Toongi, and Rawsonville.

History
The Dubbo local government area came into being on 19 February 1872, when the Municipal District of Dubbo was approved by the Colonial Secretary. The first six aldermen were elected into office on 22 April 1872 with 82 votes being cast for a wide field of candidates. James Samuels was elected Mayor at the first council meeting and remained mayor for 3 years. 

Talbragar Shire was amalgamated with the Dubbo City Council on 1 April 1980.

Council

Current composition and election method
Prior to its dissolution, the Dubbo City Council was composed of eleven Councillors elected proportionally as a single ward. All Councillors were elected for a fixed four-year term of office. The Mayor was elected by the Councillors at the first meeting of the Council. The most recent election was held on 8 September 2012, and the makeup of the former Council was as follows:

The last Council, elected in 2012 and dissolved in 2016, in order of election, was:

The former Dubbo City Council staffed around 350 permanent employees, and was responsible for the city and surrounding areas. The Civic Administration Building of the former Council is located on the corner of Darling and Church Streets and now has a "One Stop Shop" for all customers of the former council.

Industry
As a regional centre, the City of Dubbo provided services far beyond its own population base. It served 130,000 people, and one third of the geographic area of New South Wales. The main industry sectors represented in the City of Dubbo were retail, health, manufacturing, transport, tourism, education, construction, business services, agriculture, and government services.

Sister cities
The City of Dubbo had four sister cities:
 Minokamo, Japan, since 1989.
 Warringah, New South Wales, since 1994.
 Wujiang, China, since 1995.
 Newcastle, New South Wales, since 1995.

References

External links

Dubbo City Council
Dubbo Tourism (official website)
Dubbo – Visit NSW

Dubbo
Dubbo
Dubbo
Newell Highway
Dubbo